Woumen is a town in Diksmuide, a part of Belgium.

See also
 West Flanders

External links
Woumen @ City Review

Populated places in West Flanders
Sub-municipalities of Diksmuide